Sufflamen is a genus of triggerfishes native to reefs of the Indian and Pacific Oceans.

Species
There are currently 5 recognized species in this genus:
 Sufflamen albicaudatum Rüppell, 1829 (Bluethroat triggerfish)
 Sufflamen bursa Bloch & J. G. Schneider, 1801 (Boomerang triggerfish)
 Sufflamen chrysopterum Bloch & J. G. Schneider, 1801 (Halfmoon triggerfish)
 Sufflamen fraenatum Latreille, 1804 (Masked triggerfish)
 Sufflamen verres C. H. Gilbert & Starks, 1904 (Orangeside triggerfish)

References

Balistidae
Ray-finned fish genera
Taxa named by David Starr Jordan